The Commemorative Medal for Security Operations and the Maintenance of Order is a French commemorative medal established in the late 1950s for award to members of the French armed forces and French civil servants under military authority for service in French North Africa during the hectic years that would become the end of French colonialism in the region.

Award history
The war in Algeria was and remains a sensitive subject for France, the events were only first openly officially identified as a war in 1999. The Médaille Coloniale ("Colonial Medal") or Médaille d'Outre-Mer ("Overseas Medal") were for service overseas and the Croix de Guerre ("War Cross") was for service in wartime against an exterior enemy. There was no award at the time to recognize and reward combat service on what was essentially French soil. A medal was initially created by decree 56-1032 of 12 October 1956  and called the Médaille Commémorative des Opérations de Sécurité et de Maintien de l'Ordre en Afrique du Nord. It was designed to fill this void and recognize their service in what was officially called a "police action" to quell disorder, rather than a military campaign against an armed and organized enemy.  Decree 58-24 of 11 January 1958  modified the design and renamed the award to "Médaille Commémorative des Opérations de Sécurité et de Maintien de l'Ordre".

Under pressure for years by veterans' organizations and from the personnel who served during the handovers in Tunisia and Morocco to get commemorative medals of their own, the French government finally ceded by a decree dated 26 July 2004  with an amendment to the 1958 decree governing the award.  Rather than design a new medal for each operation in North Africa, the government decided to extend the eligibility, the existing medal could then be awarded to anyone who had served in North Africa during the 1950s and 1960s.

Award statute
The North Africa Security and Order Operations Commemorative Medal was awarded to:
members of the French armed forces for 90 days or more service in security and order operations in regular or reserve formations.  The time factor is waived for those cited with the Cross for Military Valour or wounded as a result of these operations;
governmental civil servants and of police services as well as those personnel placed under the authority of the military authority, or that participated in the operations proper as a result of their responsibilities or specialty, that met the aforementioned military prerequisites;
sailors of the French navy placed under the orders of the IV region's naval prefect for missions of at least 90 days in a 24-month period (added by a decree of 17 October 1960).

Five different gilt clasps could be earned and worn simultaneously when awarded.  
ALGÉRIE for 90 days service between 31 October 1954 and 1 July 1964
TUNISIE for 90 days service between 1 January 1952 and 2 July 1962
MAROC for 90 days service between 1 June 1953 and 2 July 1962
SAHARA for 90 days service between 31 October 1954 and 27 June 1961
MAURITANIE for 90 days service between 10 January 1957 and 1 January 1960

Award description
North Africa Security and Order Operations Commemorative Medal is a 30mm in diameter circular medal struck from bronze and gilded.  The obverse, engraved by Georges Lemaire, bore an allegorical image of the warrior French Republic wearing a helmet adorned with and oak leaf wreath and surrounded by the relief inscription along the medal circumference "RÉPUBLIQUE FRANÇAISE".  On the reverse, the relief inscription on five lines "MÉDAILLE" "COMMÉMORATIVE" "OPÉRATIONS SÉCURITÉ" "ET MAINTIEN" "DE L'ORDRE" surrounded by a wreath of oak and olive leaves along the medal circumference.  The pre January 1958 variant had the reverse inscription on four lines "MÉDAILLE" "COMMÉMORATIVE" "D'AFRIQUE" "DU NORD".

The medal hung from a ribbon passing through a wreath shaped ring through the medal's suspension loop.  The red silk moiré ribbon was 36mm wide with a 14mm central light blue stripe and two 5mm wide white stripes each 1mm from the edge.

Noteworthy recipients (partial list)
General Raoul Salan
General Pierre Langlois
General Paul Lardry
General Maurice Henry
General Jean Simon
General Maurice Schmitt
General Henri Amiel
General Paul Arnault
General Renaud de Corta
General Gérard Lecointe
General Bernard Janvier
General Marcel Bigeard
General Michel de Courrèges
Colonel Fred Moore
Colonel Antoine Battesti
Colonel Roger Faulques
Colonel André Salvat
Lieutenant colonel Pierre Clostermann
Lieutenant colonel Léo Vidou
Lieutenant colonel Albert Fossey-François
Lieutenant colonel Marius Guyot
Major Bernard Cabiro
Captain Hubert Clément
Chief warrant officer Jo Sohet
Master sergeant Marc Flament
François d'Orléans son of Henri d'Orléans

See also

Algerian War
French Algeria
French protectorate of Tunisia
Scramble for Africa

References

External links
 Museum of the Legion of Honour (in French)

Awards established in 1958
French campaign medals
Awards established in 1964
French colonisation in Africa
History of North Africa
Civil awards and decorations of France